The Arlington Heights Park District is one of the oldest and (financially) largest park districts in the Chicago metropolitan area.  With two golf clubs and five outdoor pools, plus one indoor, it can be considered one of the most elaborate park districts northwest of Chicago.  The district collects property taxes through the village of Arlington Heights.  The annual budget for 2010/2011 was a near $25,000,000.  The Board of Commissioners are selected by the community, each of whom selected will serve a four-year term.

History
The Arlington Heights Park District was established in 1925 with Commissioners Nathaniel Banta, Henry Klehm, Eugene Berbecker, Albert Volz, and Julius Flentie.

Jurisdiction
It lies in Elk Grove and Wheeling Townships and is bordered by Buffalo Grove and Wheeling to the north; Elk Grove Village on the south; on the west by Rolling Meadows and Palatine; on the east by Mt. Prospect. The District serves most of Arlington Heights and small portions of Palatine, Mt. Prospect, Prospect Heights, Rolling Meadows, and Lake County.

Facilities
The District owns , leases  of land and has 58 parks: community parks, neighborhood parks, play lots, passive parks, and linear parks.

Special events
The district helps run a series of annual events on the most popular holidays.

Independence Day
Every year, the Arlington Heights Park District, along with the Village and Festival Members, runs an event called Frontier Days.  
During this time period of June 30- July 5, the North American Midway Carnival runs a carnival and supplies rides and games for the community.

Christmas
During late November, the district sponsors the decorations covering at North School Park in Arlington Heights. Each year the district sells an old sculpture in spite of purchasing a new.  The district also helps sponsor the Kris Kringle Market.  The market runs from mid-December up until Christmas.

See also
 Rolling Meadows Park District
 Arlington Heights, Illinois
 Park district

References

Chicago metropolitan area
Park districts in Illinois
Arlington Heights, Illinois
Protected areas of Cook County, Illinois
Protected areas of Lake County, Illinois
1925 establishments in Illinois